Patricia Roth Schwartz (born October 12, 1946) is an American poet, playwright, and editor.

Biography
Born Patricia Roth in West Virginia, she received her B.A. in English literature from Mount Holyoke College in 1968 and her M.A. in English literature from Trinity College. She also has an M.A. in counseling psychology from Antioch College.

She had a private practice as a psychotherapist in Boston before becoming a faculty member, teaching English and psychology, at a community college in upstate New York. She retired from full-time teaching and now volunteers as a creative writing teacher at Auburn Correctional Facility. She also teaches at the Writers & Books, a literary center in Rochester, New York. Journals which have published her work include, Nimrod, The Laurel Review, Blueline, South Carolina Review, Iron Horse, Confluence, Exit-On Line, Litchfield Review, Iron Horse, Pinnacle Hill Review, Cape Rock, Poetry Motel, and The Madison Review.

Selected works

Books
 Her latest book is a full-length prose memoir, Soul Knows No Bars: A Writer's Journey Doing Poetry with Inmates from Olive Trees Publishing (2019).
 Earlier books include Know Better: Poems of Resistance and The Crows of Copper John: A History of Auburn Prison in Poems (2012)
Hungers (1979, Blue Spruce Press)
Planting Bulbs in a Time of War (Foothills, 2005)
The Names of the Moons of Mars (1989, New Victoria Publishers)

Awards and honors
Finalist:Willamette Poetry Contest from The Clackamas Literary Review in 2004
Finalist: Sow's Ear Poetry Contest, 2004
June 2002: ImageOut poetry award

External links
Biography from Foothills Publishing

1946 births
Living people
Mount Holyoke College alumni
American women poets
Writers from West Virginia
Trinity College (Connecticut) alumni
20th-century American poets
20th-century American women writers
21st-century American women